Rufus Porter (born May 18, 1965) is a former professional American football linebacker in the National Football League (NFL) for the Seattle Seahawks, New Orleans Saints, and Tampa Bay Buccaneers.

College career
Porter played at Southern University.

Professional career

Seattle Seahawks
Porter played for the Seahawks from 1988-1994. He was selected to two Pro Bowls and earned one All-Pro during his tenure. Porter suffered a serious groin injury in a game vs. Houston in 1990.

New Orleans Saints
Porter played for the Saints for two seasons.

Tampa Bay Buccaneers
Porter played his last year with the Buccaneers.

Personal
Porter's son, Rufus Jr. played Linebacker for Louisiana Tech University.

Porter operates the nonprofit organization 8to80 that focuses on building healthy lives in the Baton Rouge area.

References

External links

1965 births
Living people
American football linebackers
Southern Jaguars football players
Seattle Seahawks players
New Orleans Saints players
Tampa Bay Buccaneers players
American Conference Pro Bowl players
People from Amite City, Louisiana
Players of American football from Louisiana
Ed Block Courage Award recipients